The 2020 RPM Open was a professional tennis tournament played on outdoor clay courts. It was part of the 2020 ATP Challenger Tour. It took place at the TJ Spoje in the Žižkov neighbourhood of Prague, Czech Republic.

Singles main-draw entrants

Seeds

1 Rankings are as of 16 March 2020.

Other entrants
The following players received wildcards into the singles main draw:
 Jonáš Forejtek
 Lukáš Klein
 Jiří Lehečka
 Michael Vrbenský
 Stan Wawrinka

The following player received entry into the singles main draw using a protected ranking:
  Arthur De Greef

The following players received entry from the qualifying draw:
 Marek Gengel
 Gonçalo Oliveira

Champions

Singles

 Aslan Karatsev def.  Tallon Griekspoor 6–4, 7–6(8–6).

Doubles

 Sander Arends /  David Pel def.  André Göransson /  Gonçalo Oliveira 7–5, 7–6(7–5).

References

2020 ATP Challenger Tour
RPM Open
RPM Open